The men's freestyle 86 kilograms wrestling competition at the 2018 Asian Games in Jakarta was held on 19 August 2018 at the Jakarta Convention Center Assembly Hall.

Schedule
All times are Western Indonesia Time (UTC+07:00)

Results
Legend
F — Won by fall

Main bracket

Final

Top half

Bottom half

Repechage

Final standing

References

External links
Official website
UWW official website

Wrestling at the 2018 Asian Games